Ithome chersota is a moth in the family Cosmopterigidae. It was described by Edward Meyrick in 1915. It is found in Colombia.

References

Moths described in 1915
Chrysopeleiinae